Shesar Hiren Rhustavito (born 3 March 1994) is an Indonesian badminton player who affiliate with Djarum club. He won four consecutives Indonesia International tournament, two times at the USM International in Semarang, and two times at the Victor International in Surabaya. Rhustavito was part of the Indonesia winning team at the 2020 Thomas Cup.

Career 
In 2023, Rhustavito started his season by losing in the first round of the Malaysia Open from Kunlavut Vitidsarn of Thailand in rubber games. In the next tournament, he lost at the first round of India Open from Malaysian Lee Zii Jia. He competed in the home tournament, Indonesia Masters, but lost in the second round from his teammate Jonatan Christie.

Awards and nominations

Achievements

BWF World Tour (2 titles) 
The BWF World Tour, which was announced on 19 March 2017 and implemented in 2018, is a series of elite badminton tournaments sanctioned by the Badminton World Federation (BWF). The BWF World Tour is divided into levels of World Tour Finals, Super 1000, Super 750, Super 500, Super 300 (part of the HSBC World Tour), and the BWF Tour Super 100.

Men's singles

BWF International Challenge/Series (4 titles) 
Men's singles

  BWF International Challenge tournament
  BWF International Series tournament
  BWF Future Series tournament

Performance timeline

National team 
 Junior level

 Senior level

Individual competitions 
 Junior level

 Senior level

Record against selected opponents 
Record against year-end Finals finalists, World Championships semi-finalists, and Olympic quarter-finalists. Accurate as of 25 May 2021.

References

External links 
 

1994 births
Living people
People from Sukoharjo Regency
Sportspeople from Central Java
Indonesian male badminton players
Competitors at the 2019 Southeast Asian Games
Southeast Asian Games gold medalists for Indonesia
Southeast Asian Games medalists in badminton